Harenfa is a town and commune in Chlef Province, Algeria.

References

Communes of Chlef Province
Chlef Province